Takhteh Pol (also known as Takht-e Pol, Takht Pol, and Takht Pūr) is a village in Qorqori Rural District, Qorqori District, Hirmand County, Sistan and Baluchestan Province, Iran. At the 2006 census, its population was 163, in 33 families.

References 

Populated places in Hirmand County